Rečica (Cyrillic: Речица) is a village in the municipalities of Han Pijesak (Republika Srpska) and Olovo, Bosnia and Herzegovina.

Demographics 
According to the 2013 census, its population was nil, down from 46 living in the Han Pijesak part with also none ath the time in the Olovo part.

References

Populated places in Han Pijesak
Populated places in Olovo